The Kintetsu 21000 series is a limited express train type operated by Kintetsu Railway. Their nickname is Urban Liner plus. It received the Good Design Award in 1988 and it received the Blue Ribbon Award in 1989.

References

External links

Kintetsu website 

Electric multiple units of Japan
21000 series
Kinki Sharyo multiple units
1500 V DC multiple units of Japan